Honorio Bórquez (born 5 September 1947) is a Chilean boxer. He competed in the men's light middleweight event at the 1968 Summer Olympics. At the 1968 Summer Olympics, he lost to Stephen Thega of Kenya.

References

1947 births
Living people
Light-middleweight boxers
Chilean male boxers
Olympic boxers of Chile
Boxers at the 1968 Summer Olympics
People from Puerto Montt
20th-century Chilean people